The Hebrew word Ben, meaning "son" or "boy", forms part of many surnames in Hebrew. In the English Bible, such names include:

 Ben-ammi, "son of my people"
 Benaiah, "son of Yah"
 Bene-berak, "sons of lightning"
 Ben-hadad, "son of Hadad"
 Ben-hail, "son of valor"
 Ben-Ishado, "son of Ishado"
 Benjamin, "son of the right hand" or "son of the south"
 Ben-oni, "son of my sorrow"
 Ben-Zion, "son of Zion"

See also 
 Bar (Aramaic)